Gunner Palace is a 2004 documentary film by Michael Tucker, which had a limited release in the United States on March 4, 2005. The film was an account of the complex realities of the situation in Iraq during 2003–2004 amidst the Iraqi insurgency not seen on the nightly news. Told first-hand by American troops stationed in the middle of Baghdad, Gunner Palace presents a portrait of a dangerous and chaotic war.

Synopsis
The film documents the operations of 2nd Battalion, 3rd Field Artillery Regiment, an element of the 1st Brigade Combat Team, 1st Armored Division beginning in the late summer of 2003 until the unit was relieved by 3rd Battalion, 153rd Infantry Regiment, of the 39th Brigade Combat Team, an element of the 1st Cavalry Division in April 2004.  The soldiers were stationed in the Adhamiyah neighborhood of Baghdad which lies between the Tigris river on the west and Sadr City on the east. The unit's Forward Operating Base was at a former Presidential Palace, known as Adhamiyah Palace.

Adhamiyah Palace, a.k.a. Fort Apache, a.k.a. JSS Apache
Adhamiyah Palace, which is the backdrop for the documentary, was the scene of the last major firefight during the fall of Baghdad.  The palace, which was known as Gunner Palace during its occupation by 2-3rd FA was eventually handed over to the Iraqi Army, except for three buildings which were retained by the following on the unit, Company C, 3-153rd IN and were renamed Patrol Base Apache. The patrol base was closed and the palace was completely handed over to the Iraqi Army in 2005. The Palace was reoccupied during the "Surge" of 2006-2007 and was then known as Joint Security Station Apache. SPC Ross McGinnis, assigned to C Company, 1st Battalion, 26th Infantry Regiment, 2nd Brigade, 1st Infantry Division, stationed at JSS Apache was awarded the Medal of Honor for his actions in the Adhamiyah neighborhood when he threw himself on a grenade in order to protect his fellow soldiers.

MPAA rating
The rating is cited as "rated PG-13 on appeal for strong language throughout, violent situations and some drug references." The documentary was originally given an R rating by the MPAA for its language. However, Tucker asked the MPAA to reconsider, saying as it goes: "The video shows real life in the army overseas and the importance of the younger audiences to connect and understand what soldiers have to go through." A petition was also started. Considering the combat conditions facing the human subjects of a war documentary, the language, while strong, did not constitute constant profanity. A PG-13 rating was granted on appeal. The documentary contains 42 uses of "fuck" and its derivatives, more than any other PG-13 film.

The film has also been given a PG-13 equivalent M rating in Australia (recommended for adolescent audiences though any age is still allowed access). It also got a 15 rating in the UK (illegal for those under 15 to see in cinemas), 14A in most provinces of Canada (under 14s require guardian) and an M rating in New Zealand (Recommended for 13 and over).

References

External links
 Filmmaker website
 
 
 
 
 
 
 Interview with Cpt. Jonathan Powers, Iraq War veteran who served at Gunner Palace during filming of the documentary

2004 films
2004 documentary films
2000s war films
American documentary films
American war films
Documentary films about the Iraq War
Films set in Iraq
Films shot in Germany
Films shot in Iraq
2000s English-language films
2000s American films